Ashes of Hope is a 1917 silent film western directed by Walter Edwards and starring Belle Bennett. It was produced and released by the Triangle Film Corporation.

Cast
 Belle Bennett as Gonda
 Jack Livingston as Jim Gordon
 Jack Richardson as 'Ace High' Lawton
 Percy Challenger as Flat Foot
 Josie Sedgwick as Belle

Preservation status
 Incomplete print at the Library of Congress.

References

External links
 
 

1917 films
1917 Western (genre) films
Triangle Film Corporation films
Films directed by Walter Edwards
American black-and-white films
Silent American Western (genre) films
1910s American films
1910s English-language films